The 2012 Formula Abarth season was the eighth season of the former Formula Azzurra, and the third under its guise of "Formula Abarth". The European Championship began on 31 March in Valencia, while the Italian Championship commenced on 10 June at Mugello. They finished together on 30 September at Monza.

Nicolas Costa, who drove for Euronova Racing by Fortec, won both series, taking four victories in the Italian series and six victories in the European championship. Costa won the Italian series by nineteen points and the European series by twenty points over runner-up Luca Ghiotto of the Prema Powerteam, with third place in the European championship taken by Ghiotto's teammate Bruno Bonifacio, while Costa's teammate Emanuele Zonzini finished third in the Italian championship.

Teams and drivers

Race calendar and results
 An eight-round calendar was announced on 6 December 2011. The series will adopt a format used in a majority of the Formula Three series, with three races a weekend, two of which held on the Saturday and the final race on the Sunday. The series will support the Italian Formula Three Championship at all rounds, with the races at Valencia and Budapest also supporting the World Touring Car Championship.

Championship standings
Points were awarded as follows:

European Series

Drivers' standings

Rookies' standings

Teams' standings

Italian Series

Drivers' standings

Teams' standings

References

External links
 Official website

Formula Abarth
Formula Abarth
Formula Abarth
Abarth